Steblów  (German: Stöblau) is a village in the administrative district of Gmina Cisek, within Kędzierzyn-Koźle County, Opole Voivodeship, in south-western Poland. 

The village has a population of 333.

References

Villages in Kędzierzyn-Koźle County